Robert Julian Barbieri (born 5 June 1984) is a retired Canadian-born Italian rugby union player. He played as a flanker. He decided to represent Italy.

Club career
He played for Yeomen (2000–03) in Canada, before moving to the Italian side Overmach Rugby Parma (2003–07). Barbieri then went to play for Benetton Treviso.

On 21 May 2014, Barbieri moved to England to join Leicester Tigers, who compete in the Aviva Premiership, for the 2014-15 season. However, on 14 April 2015, Barbieri rejoined Benetton Treviso in the Pro12.

On 9 May 2019, Barbieri was released by Benetton Treviso and subsequently ended his playing career.

International career
Barbieri's first game for Italy was in the 52-6 win over Japan, on 9 June 2006, on the same day that his brother, Michael Barbieri, earned his first cap for Canada in Toronto against England. Robert Barbieri was a member of the Italian squad in the 2007 Rugby World Cup finals, but was ruled out because of injury. He took part in the 2011 Rugby World Cup. His final national team call-up was in summer 2017 for a test match in Singapore.

References

External links
Robert Barbieri international statistics

1984 births
Living people
Sportspeople from Toronto
Benetton Rugby players
Leicester Tigers players
Canadian rugby union players
Italian rugby union players
Rugby union flankers
Italy international rugby union players
Canadian sportspeople of Italian descent
Canadian expatriate sportspeople in England
Italian expatriate sportspeople in England
Expatriate rugby union players in England